Radošin is a village in the municipality of Svilajnac, Serbia. According to the 2002 census, the village has a population of 550 people.

References

Populated places in Pomoravlje District